Chocolate Milk was an American funk and soul band from New Orleans, Louisiana, active in the 1970s and early 1980s.

Biography
Chocolate Milk was formed in 1974 in New Orleans, Louisiana, after the emergence of the bands Kool & the Gang and Earth, Wind & Fire. The eight-piece band included Frank Richard (vocals), Amadee Castenell (saxophone), Joe Foxx (trumpet), Mario Tio (guitars), Earnest Dabon (bass), Robert Dabon (keyboards/piano) and Dwight Richards (drums/percussion). The band also worked as the studio group for songwriter and producer Allen Toussaint, following the tenure of the Meters as Toussaint's band. Chocolate Milk backed Toussaint as a live band and on his album New Orleans Jazz and Heritage Festival (1976), and also recorded with Paul McCartney. The band then signed with RCA Records.

Their first of eight albums released on RCA was Action Speaks Louder than Words, an album that included a political message. The title cut, "Action Speaks Louder Than Words" (1975), has a break beat that has been sampled numerous times in hip hop music, including "Move the Crowd" from the 1987 album Paid in Full by Eric B. & Rakim, and "Don't Let Your Mouth Write a Check Your Ass Can't Cash" (1991) by Stetsasonic.

The band became known for "Action Speaks Louder than Words", and other hit songs: "Girl Callin'" (1978), "Say Won't Cha" (1979), and "I'm Your Radio" (1980). The band was also known for their versatility in musical styles, later adding elements of disco, prevalent on their 1981 hit, "Blue Jeans" which peaked at number fifteen on the soul chart. Chocolate Milk broke up in 1983 due to the waning popularity of disco, numerous personnel changes, and changes in producers after splitting with Toussaint in 1980.

Discography

Studio albums
 Action Speaks Louder than Words (RCA, 1975)
 Chocolate Milk (RCA, 1976)
 Comin''' (RCA, 1976)
 We're All in This Together (RCA, 1977)
 Milky Way (RCA, 1979)
 Hipnotism (RCA, 1980)
 Blue Jeans (RCA, 1981)
 Friction (RCA, 1982)

Compilation albums
 Ice Cold Funk: The Greatest Grooves of Chocolate Milk (Razor & Tie, 1998)
 Best of Chocolate Milk'' (Camden, 2002)

Singles

References

External links
 Chocolate Milk at Discogs
 Chocolate Milk at T-Mad's Music

Musical groups established in 1974
American disco groups
American funk musical groups
Musical groups from New Orleans
American soul musical groups
RCA Records artists